Alf Mintzel is a German former professional footballer who played as a left-back or midfielder.

Career
Mintzel started off his career at his local club, ASV Rimpar. There he was picked up by Würzburger FV. He stayed for two years before moving to SpVgg Greuther Fürth. He was in Fürth for only a year before joining 1. SC Feucht. After less than a year he got an offer from rivals Kickers Offenbach, which he accepted. He played for Offenbach for two years, before joining SV Sandhausen for three years. In 2010, he left the club and joined his current team SV Wehen Wiesbaden, where he had a contract until 30 June 2012.

In May 2019, at the age of 37, Mintzel announced his retirement.

References

External links
 
 Alf Mintzel at FuPa

Living people
1981 births
Association football midfielders
German footballers
SpVgg Greuther Fürth players
SpVgg Greuther Fürth II players
Kickers Offenbach players
SV Sandhausen players
SV Wehen Wiesbaden players
2. Bundesliga players
3. Liga players
Regionalliga players
Sportspeople from Würzburg
Footballers from Bavaria